Givarbela steinbachi is a moth in the family Cossidae, and the only species in the genus Givarbela. It is found in Bolivia.

References

Natural History Museum Lepidoptera generic names catalog

Hypoptinae